The Sanfilippo Place de la Musique is a private museum in Barrington Hills, Illinois, United States, known for its collection of antique music machines, including phonographs, player pianos, fairground and band organs, calliopes, and a large theater pipe organ. It is located on the estate of Jasper and Marian Sanfilippo.  It is sometimes referred to as the Sanfilippo Collection.

Displays

Theater organ
The Wurlitzer company built the theater organ in 1927 as their Opus 1571.  It is one of the largest theater pipe organs in the world, currently having about 80 ranks and approximately 5000 pipes.  It was originally built for the Riviera Theatre in Omaha, Nebraska.  It has been restored and expanded under David Junchen, after the museum installed it in a purpose-built music room.

Steam locomotive
The steam locomotive was used in Henry Ford's Ford River Rouge Complex in Dearborn, Michigan and later displayed at the Ford Museum at Greenfield Village.

Location
Private residence.  The Sanfilippo estate includes several buildings in which artefacts are stored, curated or displayed.  The estate is known internationally for its collection of theater related objects.

Sanfilippo Foundation
The Sanfilippo Foundation is an organization associated with the museum.  It helps charities use the Sanfilippo Estate and its collections for fundraising efforts.

See also 
 List of music museums

References

External links
 Sanfilippo Foundation and museum official website

Wurlitzer
Musical instrument museums in the United States
Museums in McHenry County, Illinois
Buildings and structures completed in 1927
History museums in Illinois